Hoplolatilus purpureus, the purple sand tilefish, is a species of marine ray-finned fish, a tilefish belonging to the family Malacanthidae. It is native to the western central Pacific Ocean where its range includes Indonesia, Timor-Leste, Philippines, Papua New Guinea and the Solomon Islands. This species can reach a length of  total length. It can also be found in the aquarium trade.

References

purpureus
Taxa named by George H. Burgess
Fish described in 1978